Mont de la Gouille is a mountain of the Swiss Pennine Alps, located south of Bourg-Saint-Pierre in the canton of Valais. It belong to the Mont Vélan massif.

References

External links
 Mont de la Gouille on Hikr

Mountains of the Alps
Alpine three-thousanders
Mountains of Valais
Mountains of Switzerland